Gateway Group is one of Sri Lanka's educational conglomerates. Established in 1986 by R. I. T. Alles, former State Secretary of Education and a prominent educator in Sri Lanka, the Gateway Group's subsidiaries include international schools, graduate education and professional training throughout the country and abroad.

Gateway colleges 

The Gateway Colleges are a chain of privately owned coeducational international schools for students from 2 to 18 years. 

Gateway offers students the opportunity to follow the Pearson Edexcel curriculum, Cambridge as well as SACE curriculum and carries out teaching in English.

The Gateway chain of International schools include: 

 Gateway College Colombo 
 Gateway College Dehiwala
 Gateway College Negombo
 Gateway College Ratmalana
 Gateway College Kandy

References

External links
Gateway Group

Companies of Sri Lanka